Lennart Stoll (born 3 May 1996) is a German footballer who plays as a midfielder for Regionalliga Südwest club SSV Ulm 1846.

References

External links
 

Living people
1996 births
Sportspeople from Münster
German footballers
Association football midfielders
SC Preußen Münster players
3. Liga players
Footballers from North Rhine-Westphalia